is a 1981 Japanese animated science fiction neo-western film based on the second volume of the same name of the Doraemon Long Stories series. The film was released in the theatres of Japan on 14 March 1981. It is the 2nd Doraemon film. In 2009, the film was remade as Doraemon: The Record of Nobita's Spaceblazer.

Plot

Seven years ago, Lopplc and Morina were playing at a park. Suddenly they felt an earthquake on the Koya Koya Planet. The quake was so massive that the planet was destroyed. Everyone had to escape using a giant ship. A sudden bolt of lightning damaged the ship, causing a power failure. The Professor (who was Morina's father) wanted to fix the spaceship, but another lightning strike took him to another dimension. Meanwhile, Nobita's friends get him to retrieve a ball from a group of tough baseball players. But they chase him and drop him down a manhole. Gian gets angry upon him, and he runs toward Shizuka's house to save himself. But finally caught by him and beaten off well. Two alternate universe creatures, Lopplc and Chammy, are escaping from an enemy ship. While Nobita is sleeping, he suddenly feels the floor is trembling, like an earthquake. A little rabbit from the alternate universe named Chammy opens the door between the dimensions using a hammer. Nobita wakes up, and Doraemon hears somebody steal food from the fridge. Chammy is caught by Doraemon and Nobita. She shows them the passageway through Nobita's floor into the spaceship. After they enter the spaceship, they see Koya Koya Planet, and meet Lopplc (12 years old). Soon they become good friends.

Lopplc takes Nobita to his friend Morina who continuously ignores them. On the next visit, Nobita brings his friends with him, and they play in a meadow. They got attacked by mining agents who wanted to get crystals from the planet's crust. All of them run away to their own dimension. The next day Nobita is scolded by his mother for hiding his test paper. Nobita and Doraemon again decide to meet Lopplc, but suddenly Dorami comes and takes Doraemon for his check up. Nobita decides to go alone to Koya Koya Planet. Abruptly he got sucked by another dimension, and he reaches to another planet. He got chased by a dinosaur, only to be saved by Doraemon' gadget. On the next visit, the mining agents warn them to move from there, but they fight with them easily as there was the difference in the gravities of both planets. They quickly defeated them and destroyed their ship. Lopplc tells all of the town's people about Doraemon and Nobita, but miners took the ship, so they had no evidence to prove that. Every time the miners try to tease people, Doraemon and Nobita save them. So people agreed that Nobita and Doraemon are really strong. Soon the leader of the group of miners learned of Doraemon and Nobita. He devised a trap to catch them, but Doraemon and Nobita luckily destroyed their plans. So the leader decided to take care of them himself. The leader went Morina, to tell him the secret passage through Nobita and Doraemon come. Morina tells them as he told her that her father died as a result of the mayor's decision. Leader fixes the bomb to the Dimensional door so that anyone who opened it will be blasted.

The leader warned the people of the Planet Koya Koya to leave the planet; otherwise, he would blast the planet. People ask Lopplc to call Nobita. Lopplc goes to the dimensional door, and the door blasted. Luckily he got saved. He tells Chammy that he is going to the mining resort. On the other side, Nobita's mother ordered him to study hard, and she call Shizuka and Dorami to keep an eye on Nobita. Nobita tells them the whole story, and suddenly, the dimensional door opens, and Chammy gets into it and tells Nobita that Koya Koya is in trouble. Nobita and Doraemon get into the door while Shizuka runs away to call Gian and Suneo. Doraemon and Nobita, with the help of Chammy, go to the resort. There they fight with the miner's robot. Gian and Suneo also helped them, and finally, the leader fights with Nobita, and Nobita shoot him off with his toy gun. The leader presses the auto-destruction button and flees away. Doraemon and Nobita, with the help of Lopplc and Morina, use the robotic machine to take the destruction device away from the planet into the space, where it explodes, and due to dimensional distortion, they reach to another dimension, where Morina finds his father.

The group returns to the planet, and after greeting Doraemon and Nobita, return to their home.

Cast

Release
Doraemon: The Records of Nobita, Spaceblazer was released theatrically in Japan on 14 March 1981, where it was distributed by Toho.

References

Footnotes

Sources

External links

1981 films
1981 anime films
Record of Nobita, The: Spaceblazer
Animated films about extraterrestrial life
Films directed by Hideo Nishimaki
Films set on fictional planets
Japanese animated science fiction films
Films scored by Shunsuke Kikuchi
1980s children's animated films